Peter Dokl (born 11 January 1985) is a Slovenian biathlete.

Dokl represented Slovenia at the 2010 Winter Olympics.

References

External links
Sports reference

1985 births
Living people
Slovenian male biathletes
Olympic biathletes of Slovenia
Biathletes at the 2010 Winter Olympics
Biathletes at the 2014 Winter Olympics
21st-century Slovenian people